Fabrizio Sceberras Testaferrata (1 April 1757 - 3 August 1843) was a native of Malta and a bishop and cardinal of the Catholic Church. He was Bishop of Senigallia from 1818 until his death in 1843.

Biography
Testaferrata was born to a noble family in Valletta, Malta, on 1 April 1757. The date of his ordination is unknown, but he was ordained at the Collegio Clementino in Rome before being named a canon of Malta's cathedral in 1776. Popes Pius VI and Pius VII assigned him positions of increasing responsibility as administrator of ecclesiastical territories in Italy.

On 20 September 1802, Pope Pius VII appointed him titular archbishop of Berytus. Testaferrata was consecrated a bishop by Cardinal Giuseppe Doria Pamphili on 21 December 1802. In 1803, he was appointed Apostolic Nuncio to Switzerland. In 1815 he was appointed Secretary of the Congregation of Bishops and Regulars. 

Pope Pius VII made him a cardinal in pectore, that is, without public announcement, in 1816 and then on 6 April 1818 named him Cardinal Priest of Santa Pudenziana. He was the first Maltese to become a member of the College of Cardinals. That same day he was appointed Bishop of Senigallia, Italy.

Testaferrata participated in the conclaves that elected Pope Leo XII in 1823, Pope Pius VIII in 1829, and Pope Gregory XVI in 1830–31. 

He died on 3 August 1843 and was buried in the Cathedral of Senigallia.

See also
Catholic Church in Italy

References

External links
Catholic Hierarchy 
Times of Malta

1757 births
1843 deaths
Apostolic Nuncios to Switzerland
Roman Catholic titular archbishops
Maltese cardinals
18th-century Maltese Roman Catholic priests
People from Valletta
Officials of the Roman Curia
19th-century Italian Roman Catholic bishops
Cardinals created by Pope Pius VII